Ruslan Vladimirovich Fayfer (born 10 May 1991) is a Russian professional boxer who has held the EBP cruiserweight title since 2019. As of May 2020, he is ranked as the world's fourth best active cruiserweight by the WBC, and sixth by the WBO.

As an amateur he won a gold medal at the 2010 World University Boxing Championships in the light-heavyweight division.

Early life
Fayfer was born on 10 May 1991 in Siberian village Ust-Barguzin. He was drawn to the sport as a small child after watching action films like Bloodsport starring Jean-Claude Van Damme. He dreamed of getting in the ring, but his hometown was too small to have a gym. However, at the age of nine he moved with his family to Dzhubga over 6500 miles away, where they found him a coach and he began his training.

He won Russian junior championships in 2004 and 2005 as well as a gold medal in the light-heavyweight event at the 2010 World University Boxing Championships in Ulaanbaatar, Mongolia.

Professional career
Fayfer made his professional debut on 30 August 2013, defeating Ukrainian rival Roman Mirzoev via unanimous decision (UD) in Blagoveshchenskaya, Russia. Two years later, in July 2015, he took the Russian heavyweight title from prospect Vladimir Goncharov by way of majority decision (MD) in Moscow, giving the previously-undefeated fighter his first loss. Fayfer added seven more wins in 2016, capping the year off with a first-round knockout (KO) of former IBO world champion Fulgencio Zúñiga in Montpellier that improved his record as a pro to 18–0.

For his next fight, he matched up against Argentine veteran Cesar David Crenz in Saint Petersburg on 25 March 2017 for the vacant IBF International cruiserweight title. Fayfer took him down with a left hook to the chin in the first round, and finished him with a liver shot in the second to win the belt. He then stopped Ugandan contender David Basajjamivule in the fourth round of his first title defense that June, also picking up the vacant WBA Asia cruiserweight title in the process. He had three consecutive non-title victories, including one in August 2017 over American Junior Wright for the #2 spot in the IBF rankings. Fayfer suffered his first career defeat on 13 October 2018, losing by unanimous decision (116–111, 115–112, 114–113) to Andrew Tabiti in the cruiserweight quarter-finals of the 2018–19 World Boxing Super Series.

Fayfer faced undefeated compatriot Yury Kashinsky on 30 November 2019 in an IBF title eliminator where Kashinsky's EBP cruiserweight title was also on the line, winning by unanimous decision (115–111, 115–111, 114–112) to earn a future world title bout against Yunier Dorticos.

Professional boxing record

Personal life
After graduating from high school in Dzhubga, Fayfer studied at Irkutsk State University for five years. He now lives and trains in Krasnodar.

References

External links
 
 Ruslan Fayfer profile at rusboxing.ru

Living people
1991 births
Russian male boxers
Cruiserweight boxers
Heavyweight boxers
Irkutsk State University alumni
People from Barguzinsky District
People from Krasnodar Krai
Sportspeople from Krasnodar
Bridgerweight boxers